Susan Polis Schutz (née Polis; born May 23, 1944) is an American poet, film-maker, and businesswoman who co-founded the greeting card and book publisher Blue Mountain Arts. She is the mother of Colorado Governor Jared Polis.

Early life and education
Schutz was born in Peekskill, New York, and is the daughter of June (née Keller) and David Polis. Her grandparents were Jewish immigrants from Russia. Schutz earned a Bachelor of Arts degree from Rider University in 1966, where she studied English and biology.

Career 
After earning her undergraduate degree, Schutz worked as a teacher and social worker in the Harlem neighborhood of Manhattan. She also took graduate courses in psychology and worked as a freelance writer for local publications.

Schutz and Blue Mountain Arts came to wider attention with the founding, in 1996, of the bluemountain.com website. One of the earliest experiments with the electronic greeting card medium, the site was widely adopted by web users. In 1999, the dot-com venture Excite@Home bought bluemountain.com in a deal valued at $780 million. The 1999 price paid for bluemountain.com became an example of what was later seen as the excesses of the dot-com bubble: the website was sold again in 2001, to greeting card company American Greetings, for just $35 million in cash.

Schutz is the executive producer and director of the documentary film Anyone and Everyone. The film featured the coming-out stories of gay sons and daughters and their parents and premiered on KPBS public television in San Diego, California in August 2007, before being scheduled to air on a number of other public television stations in the United States.

Personal life 
Schutz has two grandchildren through her son Jared and son-in-law Marlon Reis.

References

External links
 
 Blue Mountain Arts

1944 births
Living people
American Reform Jews
American businesspeople
American women poets
American people of Russian-Jewish descent
People from Peekskill, New York
Writers from New York (state)
20th-century American poets
20th-century American women writers
21st-century American women writers
21st-century American poets
Rider University alumni